Puzur-Suen (c. 24th – 23rd century BC) was a king of Sumer, son of Queen Kugbau, the 1st ruler of the 4th dynasty of Kish.

He ruled in Kish for 25 years, according to the Sumerian King List. His son was King Ur-Zababa. Nothing else is known about him.

See also 
Chart of ancient Near East rulers

Notes 

Sumerian kings
Kings of Kish
24th-century BC Sumerian kings
23rd-century BC Sumerian kings